Street Riders is an urban street racing game on the PlayStation Portable developed by Virtuos's Shanghai studio. The game is about fierce weapons-based combat during races. In total there will are 66 missions, 14 weapons and 30 vehicles. It is based on the console game, 187 Ride or Die.

External links
Street Riders at GameSpot

2006 video games
PlayStation Portable games
PlayStation Portable-only games
Racing video games
Ubisoft games
Video games developed in China
Virtuos games
Multiplayer and single-player video games